The men's high jump event at the 2015 Asian Athletics Championships was held on June 7.

Results

References

High
High jump at the Asian Athletics Championships